Goldschmid is a German surname meaning "gold smith". Notable people with the surname include:

 Harvey Goldschmid, law professor at Columbia University
 David Goldschmid

See also
 Goldschmid
 Goldschmidt
 Goldschmied
 Goldschmitt
 Goldsmid
 Goldsmith
 Aurifaber

Occupational surnames